Daily Planet Racing was an Australian motor racing team that competed in the Australian Touring Car Championship and V8 Supercars between 1992 and 2000.

History
Daily Planet Racing was formed in 1992 by Daily Planet proprietor John Trimbole. Initially competing in the Holden HQ series, a Holden VL Commodore was purchased from Garry Rogers Motorsport. For the Bathurst 1000, two cars were entered with a second VL leased from Perkins Engineering. Only the latter started, with the other heavily damaged in practice.

In 1993, Trimbole raced Larry Perkins' 1992 season VL Commodore and a Mitsubishi Lancer GSR in production car racing, before purchasing Perkins' 1993 Bathurst 1000 winning VP Commodore for 1994.

In 1995, an ex-Dick Johnson Racing Ford EB Falcon was purchased. In 1997, an ex-Wayne Gardner Racing VS Commodore was acquired. After this was destroyed at Bathurst when Tomas Mezera barrel rolled, a Gibson Motorsport VS was acquired in 1999. This was written off in May 2000 at the Phillip Island round of the development series, bringing an end to the team.

Drivers

Supercars Drivers
 John Trimbole (1997, 1999)
 Kevin Heffernan (1999)

Super2 Drivers
 John Trimbole (2000)

References

Australian auto racing teams
Supercars Championship teams
Auto racing teams established in 1992
Auto racing teams disestablished in 2000
1992 establishments in Australia
2000 disestablishments in Australia